Ubiquitin D is a protein that in humans is encoded by the UBD gene, also known as FAT10. UBD acts like ubiquitin, by covalently modifying proteins and tagging them for destruction in the proteasome.

Interactions 

UBD has been shown to interact with NUB1 and MAD2L1.

References

Further reading 

 
 
 
 
 
 
 
 
 
 
 
 
 
 
 

Genes on human chromosome 6